Pavel Leonidovich Syrchin (7 November 1957  – 24 October 2020) was a Soviet heavyweight weightlifter. In 1979, he won the Soviet and world titles and placed second at the European championships.

Syrchin was an honored citizen of Krasnokamsk, where he worked as a weightlifting coach. His son Pavel Jr. also became a competitive weightlifter.

He died from COVID-19 in Perm, Russia, on 24 October 2020.

References

1957 births
2020 deaths
People from Gubakha
Soviet male weightlifters
World Weightlifting Championships medalists
European Weightlifting Championships medalists
Deaths from the COVID-19 pandemic in Russia